Akano Samuel (born 26 July 1987, known professionally as Spax) is a Nigerian record producer. He is known for producing "Damages" for Tems and executive producing Oxygene by Oxlade.

He is notable with the mainstream sound tag "Classic" and "if it's Spax then it gotta be" which is well known in the African mainstream music scene.

Early life and career

Born in Minna, Niger State, Nigeria, and grew up in Lagos.

In 2020, he produced "Damages", the only single from Tems's first EP, For Broken Ears.

On 27 March 2020, he executive produced Oxygene EP by Oxlade.

In 2020, he was nominated for producer of the year at The Headies 2020.

On October 2, 2021, he was among the Apple Music‘Oshe Naija’ campaign for Indpedence Day by Nigerian producers.

Production Discography

Executive Producer
Oxygene (EP) - Oxlade
Serenade EP- Funbi
Clone Wars 4 - Show dem camp

Album/EP

Singles

Awards and nominations

References

1987 births
Living people
Nigerian hip hop record producers